The 2008–09 Toyota Racing Series was the fifth running of the Toyota Racing Series. The Toyota Racing Series is New Zealand's premier open-wheeler motorsport category. The Series includes races for every major trophy in New Zealand circuit racing including the New Zealand Motor Cup and the Denny Hulme Memorial Trophy. The cars are also the category for the 2009 New Zealand Grand Prix, which was held as the third race of the Manfeild Autocourse round, – one of only two races in the world with FIA approval to use the Grand Prix nomenclature outside Formula One.

Mitch Cunningham won the championship by over 100 points ahead of Sam MacNeill and Michael Burdett; finishing as the round winner in three of the six meetings.

Teams and drivers
The following teams and drivers are competing during the 2008–09 Toyota Racing Series. All drivers compete in Tatuus TT104ZZ chassis.

Calendar

NC – The Hamilton event is not part of the Toyota Racing Series Championship.

Results

External links
Official website of the Toyota Racing Series

Toyota Racing Series
Toyota Racing Series
Toyota Racing Series, 2008-09